The Belfast News is a weekly free-sheet spin-off from the Belfast News Letter. It is published by Johnston Publishing (NI), a holding company for Johnston Press who owns thirty-seven titles across Ireland.

Newspapers published in Northern Ireland
Mass media in Belfast
Newspapers published by Johnston Press